Wedding Bible may refer to:

 Wedding Bible (gift), a Bible associated with weddings
 Wedding Bible, a Chinese film of 2020